Geoffrey Paul Barrow (born 9 December 1971) is an English music producer, composer, and DJ. He is a member of the bands Portishead, Beak and  supergroup Quakers, and has scored several films.

Portishead—formed in 1991—was named after the small coastal town near Bristol where Barrow grew up. On his intentions in forming Portishead, he has stated, "I just wanted to make interesting music, proper songs with a proper life span and a decent place in people's record collections."

Life and career

Portishead
Born in Walton in Gordano, Somerset, Geoff and his mother moved to the town Portishead when he was eleven, after his parents divorced. After being involved in many local rock bands, playing drums and DJing in hip hop groups, Barrow got his first job at the Coach House Studios as a tape operator soon after it opened in 1989. In 1991, while he was assisting on Massive Attack's breakthrough album Blue Lines, the band allowed him spare studio time to get his own ideas on tape. Soon after, Barrow met Beth Gibbons during a coffee break at an Enterprise Allowance course. They formed the band Portishead, later adding third member Adrian Utley, releasing their debut album Dummy in 1994 to critical acclaim. The group have since produced two more studio albums, a live album, and various singles in the years since. Their most recent album, Third, was released in April 2008. The group performed for the first time in seven years at the on 2 May 2022, as part of a War Child concert benefitting refugees and children affected by the Ukraine war.

Invada
In 2001, Barrow formed the Australian record label Invada, whose artist roster includes acts such as RuC.L and ARIA-award-winning group Koolism), together with Katalyst's Ashley Anderson. In 2003 he set up the UK arm of Invada, a more experimental music label with partner Fat Paul. Bands who released work through Invada included Gonga, Team Brick, Atavist, Joe Volk, malakai and Crippled Black Phoenix. Barrow co-produced and co-wrote Stephanie McKay's 2003 debut album, McKay, under the pseudonym Fuzzface. The album featuring songs co-penned by Tim Saul and Carl Hancock Rux.

Side-projects, producing and collaborations
At the dawn of the '90s, Barrow was making a name for himself as a remixer, working with such artists as Primal Scream, Paul Weller, Gabrielle and Depeche Mode. He produced a track for Tricky and wrote songs for Neneh Cherry, both of whom were based in Bristol and also worked with Massive Attack. He has remixed songs for both Gravediggaz and the Pharcyde. In 2005, Barrow and Portishead collaborator Adrian Utley produced the Coral's third album, The Invisible Invasion. In 2009, Barrow produced the Horrors' second album Primary Colours with Craig Silvey. He mixed the self-titled debut album by Billy Nomates, as well as her EP Emergency Telephone.

In 2009 he formed Beak with Billy Fuller (Fuzz Against Junk) and Matt Williams (Team Brick). Their self-titled album was released in 2009. In 2010 the group performed as the backing band for Anika's self-titled debut album. Barrow had met Anika, a political journalist, and proposed recording material together. The album was produced over twelve days, using one room, no overdubs or repair, and only edits to create arrangements. The album's lead single, "Yang Yang", was released on 17 November 2009 through Invada and Stones Throw Records in the USA and Japan.

In early 2012, Barrow's new hip hop project Quakers was announced to be releasing an album on Stones Throw. He also formed the musical project Drokk with TV composer Ben Salisbury and released the album Drokk: Music inspired by Mega-City One, with songs inspired by the comic book character Judge Dredd. On 2 July Barrow, Billy Fuller and Matt Williams released their second Beak album through Invada. On 20 September 2018 the band, with Will Young replacing Williams, released their third album on Invada.

Film work
Barrow was the music supervisor for the Banksy film Exit Through the Gift Shop, which premièred at the Sundance Film Festival on 24 January 2010, and was released in April 2010.

In 2013, Barrow collaborated again with Ben Salisbury on the score for the Alex Garland film Ex Machina. The pair also worked together on a 2018 film Annihilation, 2020 miniseries Devs and 2022 film Men. The duo also collaborated on the scores for the Black Mirror episode "Men Against Fire" and the Netflix series Archive 81. Barrow, Salisbury and Simon Ashdown produced the score for the Prime Video series Hanna.

Beak performed the soundtrack for Tom Geens' 2015 film Couple in a Hole, drawing largely on the band's earlier material. In 2016, Barrow scored the Ben Wheatley film Free Fire.

Credits

Production and guest appearances

References

External links
 
 Invada Records
 Geoff Barrow on MySpace (as noted in the Portishead's MySpace blog)
 Beak on MySpace
 Interview with 3news.co.nz

1971 births
English record producers
Living people
People from Portishead, Somerset
English DJs
Portishead (band) members
Quakers (band) members
Musicians from Bristol